Bellair-Meadowbrook Terrace is an unincorporated area and census-designated place (CDP) in Clay County, Florida, United States. The population was 13,343 at the 2010 census.

Geography
Bellair-Meadowbrook Terrace is located in northeastern Clay County at  (30.177189, -81.741776), along the border with Duval County (the city of Jacksonville). To the east and partially to the south is the town of Orange Park. Also to the south, beyond Kingsley Avenue (State Road 224) is the CDP of Lakeside. Bellair-Meadowbrook Terrace is the home of the Orange Park Mall.

The Bellair-Meadowbrook Terrace CDP contains the separate unincorporated communities of Bellair, Meadowbrook Terrace, and North Meadowbrook Terrace within its boundaries. Residents of this area often will say they live in Orange Park, although they are outside the town limits.

Notable people

Lynyrd Skynyrd vocalist Ronnie Van Zant was buried at Jacksonville Memorial Gardens (adjacent to the Orange Park Mall) in 1977, but his remains were relocated to an undisclosed location after vandals broke into his tomb and that of bandmate Steve Gaines on June 29, 2000. Van Zant's casket was pulled out and spilled on the ground. The bag containing Gaines' ashes was torn open and some spilled onto the grass. Their mausoleums remain as memorials for fans to visit.

Demographics

As of the census of 2010, there were 13,343 people, a 19.3% decrease from 2010. There were 5,296 households, and 3,460 families residing in the CDP. The racial makeup of the CDP was 70.9% White, 17.9% African American, 0.5% Native American, 3.66% Asian, 0.2% Pacific Islander, 4.3% from other races, and 3.6% from two or more races. Hispanic or Latino of any race were 12.9% of the population.

There were 6,447 households, out of which 33.2% had children under the age of 18 living with them, 50.3% were married couples living together, 14.4% had a female householder with no husband present, and 31.1% were non-families. 23.3% of all households were made up of individuals, and 5.0% had someone living alone who was 65 years of age or older.  The average household size was 2.53 and the average family size was 2.98.

In the CDP, the population was spread out, with 25.1% under the age of 18, 11.4% from 18 to 24, 30.9% from 25 to 44, 23.6% from 45 to 64, and 9.1% who were 65 years of age or older.  The median age was 33 years. For every 100 females, there were 93.9 males.  For every 100 females age 18 and over, there were 91.2 males.

The median income for a household in the CDP was $42,426, and the median income for a family was $47,926. Males had a median income of $32,936 versus $23,117 for females. The per capita income for the CDP was $21,095.  About 5.9% of families and 7.5% of the population were below the poverty line, including 11.8% of those under age 18 and 1.1% of those age 65 or over.

References

Census-designated places in Clay County, Florida
Census-designated places in the Jacksonville metropolitan area
Census-designated places in Florida